Morison is a surname found in the English-speaking world. It is a variant form of Morrison. It was one of the original ways of spelling the name of the Clan Morrison, before Morrison with two r's became popular.

People with this surname
 Charles Morison (1861–1920), New Zealand barrister
 Elsie Morison (1924–2016), Australian operatic soprano
 Harriet Morison (1862–1925), New Zealand suffragist and trade unionist
 James Augustus Cotter Morison (1832–1888), English writer
 Patricia Morison (1915-2018), American actress
 Robert Morison (1620–1683), Scottish botanist
 Samuel Eliot Morison (1887–1976), American historian
 Samuel Loring Morison (born 1944), former American intelligence analyst
 Stanley Morison (1889–1967), British typographer, typographic theoretician and type designer
 Steve Morison (born 1983), Welsh footballer

See also
Morrison (disambiguation)